Luna Park Sydney is a heritage-listed amusement park located at 1 Olympic Drive in the harbourside suburb of Milsons Point, New South Wales, Australia, on the northern shore of Sydney Harbour. The amusement park is owned by the Luna Park Reserve Trust, an agency of the Government of New South Wales, and was added to the New South Wales State Heritage Register on 5 March 2010.

Luna Park was closed in mid-1979, immediately following the Ghost Train fire, which killed six children and one adult. Most of the park was demolished, and a new amusement park was constructed; this originally operated under the name of Harbourside Amusement Park before resuming the Luna Park name. The park was closed again in 1988 as an independent engineering inspection determined that several rides needed urgent repair. The owners failed to repair and reopen the park before a New South Wales government deadline, and ownership was passed to a new body.

Reopening in 1995, Luna Park closed again after thirteen months because of the Big Dipper rollercoaster: noise pollution complaints from residents on the clifftop above the park caused the ride's operating hours to be heavily restricted, and the resultant drop in attendance made the park unprofitable. After another redevelopment, Luna Park reopened in 2004 and has continued operating since.

Luna Park is one of two amusement parks in the world that are protected by government legislation; several of the buildings on the site are also listed on the (now defunct) Register of the National Estate and the New South Wales State Heritage Register. Architectural plans and drawings of rides and buildings at Luna Park (Milson’s Point, New South Wales) are held at the State Library of New South Wales, including the Ghost Train ride. The plans and drawings include some from Luna Park (St Kilda, Victoria) and Luna Park (Glenelg South Australia).

The park has been utilised as a filming location for several movies and television shows.

History 
Prior to European settlement of Australia and well into the 19th century, the site of Luna Park was occupied by the Cammeraigal (also spelt as Cammeraygal) Clan, part of the larger Kuringgai Tribe.

"It was a block of 120 acres which had been originally granted to Robert Ryan, a private soldier who arrived in the First Fleet, and had passed via Charles Grimes the surveyor-general to its new owner". James Milson settled on there in 1806 "where by the grace of Robert Campbell, he grazed his herd and built his house".

From 1822 onwards Milson signed a lease for this land paying A£8 per year but later disputed Campbell's claim to it. Although another 12-year lease was signed in 1830 Campbell eventually sued Milson for trespass. No part of this grant passed into the hands of Milson "until well after the death of Campbell" (in 1846). In 1830 Jamaican ex-convict Billy Blue commenced the first ferry service across Sydney Harbour. Seven years later a regular wharf and waterman's service was operating from the site. In 1842 Milsons Point was declared a public landing place and by 1860 a regular vehicular ferry service was operating between Milsons Point and Fort Macquarie. In 1886 a tram service commenced between the newly constructed terminus at Milsons Point and North Sydney.

Three years later the site was quarried to prepare for the construction of the North Shore Railway Line extension from St Leonards to Milsons Point which followed the shoreline of Lavender Bay. A train station was located at the tip of Milsons Point adjacent to the existing wharf and tram terminus which became the major transport hub of the north In 1915 in preparation for building a bridge across the harbour a new temporary station and ferry wharf was completed further back on the line in Lavender Bay. From the mid 1800s the area on top of the cliff above the site was developed for housing. Directly above the site was Northcliff House which was demolished in the 1920s however the fig trees in the park on the cliff top are believed to be remnants of this period.

In 1916 a plan for the bridge across Sydney Harbour was accepted by the Parliamentary Works Committee. The tender for the construction of the new bridge was awarded to English engineering firm Dorman Long and Company in 1924. Work began on the bridge the following year. Dorman Long built a number of workshops on the Luna Park site for the fabrication and assembly of steel components used in construction of the bridge, as per the conditions of their contract. Milsons Point Railway Station was relocated in 1924 to the site of the station constructed in 1915. The Sydney Harbour Bridge was officially opened in 1932 which meant that Lavender Bay/Milson Point station and the use of vehicular ferries were made redundant.

Beginnings

The location of Luna Park was formerly occupied by a series of workshops, cranes, and railway sidings used to provide for the construction of the Sydney Harbour Bridge. When the Harbour Bridge was completed in 1932, North Sydney Council opened applications for tenders to develop the site.

The first "Luna Park" was opened at Coney Island, New York in 1903. It was followed by another Luna Park at Glenelg in 1930 to a design by Rupert Browne. Luna Park, Glenelg was owned by the Phillips brothers: Herman, Leon and Harold and managed by David Atkins. When the South Australian venture faced difficulties in 1934 the Philips looked for a suitable place in Sydney. At the same time tenders were sought to use the former Dorman Long site for public amusements. Herman Phillips, who formed Luna Park (NSW) Ltd (with his brothers and A. A. Abrahams), won the tender. The lease started on 11 September 1935 for a 20-year period at an annual rent of £1,500. Immediately after this, Luna Park Glenelg was placed in voluntary liquidation. The rides from Glenelg were purchased by Phillips and his fellow directors, dismantled, transported to Sydney, and reassembled at the Milsons Point site. The construction and reassembly cost £60,000, took place over a three-month period in 1935 by Stuart Brothers under the direction of David Atkins and Ted Hopkins, and employed almost 1,000 engineers, structural workers, fitters, and artists, led by Hoppy and Arthur "Art" Barton.

Official opening and heyday

Luna Park was officially opened to the public on 4 October 1935, to almost immediate success. Long queues waited in front of the park's notable entry's giant face, designed by Rupert Browne, which is between two Art Deco decorated towers culminating with spires imitating the New York Chrysler Building. Most wanted to rush in and be first on the Big Dipper, the park's rickety roller coaster ride. The North Sydney Olympic Pool was opened the following year on an adjacent site. After a successful opening season, the park closed down for the winter months (a process which was repeated until 1972). During the closed season, rides were overhauled and repainted, and new rides and attractions were added, to provide the impression to patrons that the park had changed during the three-month closures.

During the Second World War, Luna Park was a magnet for servicemen; both those treating their girlfriends to a night out, and those looking to meet someone. The park's external lights were 'browned out' in case of a Japanese sneak attack on Sydney, the neon lights were disconnected, and non-essential uses of electricity (primarily for ride facades) were curtailed. The influx of servicemen drew prostitutes to the area, and large-scale brawls were a common occurrence - usually between Australian home defence troops and American sailors on shore leave.

In the early 1950s, numerous changes and additions were made to Luna Park. Atkins and Hopkins went on a world tour, bringing back new ride designs and amusements from amusement parks in the Netherlands, the United States, Germany, and Britain. The Rotor was constructed and installed, and became the stage of many stunts. Arthur Barton redesigned and reconstructed the enormous face over the park's entrance, which had begun to sag and distort. This design of the Face was based on illustrations of Old King Cole, and was the basis for the current incarnation of the Face.

The heyday for Luna Park was between 1935 and 1970. During this period the Park underwent a series of alterations including the introduction of new rides and amusements. The original entrance and famous face were remodelled in 1938–9, 1946–7, 1960, 1973, 1982 and 1995. In 1950 the Phillips brothers, now in their 60s, were bought out by David Atkins, Ted Hopkins and the others. Hopkins (known as 'Hoppy') became the manager of Luna Park in 1957 after the death of Atkins. When Hopkins retired in 1969 the leasehold was taken over by World Trade Centre Pty Ltd. Under the new management, winter closures were abandoned. As Luna Park was opened all year around there was no opportunity to carry out regular maintenance works on the rides.

A version of the Rotor, the spinning machine invented by Professor Hoffmeister, which had been a big hit at the Festival of Britain in 1951, was erected in Luna Park. This worked by centrifugal force and remains in operation today. A man named Thompson came up with the idea for a ride named "A Trip to the Moon" at Coney Island, New York, in 1902 and this became the centrepiece of the world's first Luna Park.

The increasing availability of television and motor cars in the late 1950s and early 1960s offered the public significant entertainment alternatives. Despite efforts by Hopkins (at that point Park Manager) to maintain public interest throughout the late 1950s and 1960s, including the installation of the Wild Mouse and the hiring of silhouette artist S. John Ross (who stayed at the park for thirty years), the park and the remaining six years of its lease were sold in 1969.

New ownership
A consortium named World Trade Centre Pty Ltd purchased the site and lease for $750,000. Hopkins and Barton, the last of the 'original showmen' that had built, run, and maintained the park, retired in 1970, leaving the park in the hands of the purchasing consortium. Soon after this, World Trade Centre Pty Ltd applied to construct a $50 million international trade centre on the Luna Park site, consisting of seven high-rise buildings,  of exhibition space, and a heliport. This plan was rejected by the Government of New South Wales, and, after a reshuffle within the consortium, the decision was made to continue operation as an amusement park.

Over the next few years, the new managers scrapped several of the old rides, replacing them with new, American-designed thrill rides. After consultation with Hanna-Barbera, Luna Park's slogan was temporarily changed from "Just for Fun" to "The Place where Happiness is". Another result of the consultation was the creation of a short-lived park mascot, 'Luna Bear - the Space Age Koala'. The park was opened year-round in 1972, removing the ride overhaul and maintenance period. In 1973 Martin Sharp and Peter Kingston undertook repainting works on the Park in the Pop Art Style which included a new expression on the entrance face which was repainted with a clown-like mask offset by strong primary colours. By 1975, Luna Park was operating on a week-to-week lease with plans to develop the Lavender Bay foreshores as a "Tivoli Gardens".

When Luna Park's lease expired in 1975, the directors went into negotiation with the New South Wales government to renew it. However, when Neville Wran became Premier in 1976 the negotiations ground to a halt. The park was allowed to continue operating. In 1977 an exhibition was held at the Art Gallery of NSW called "Fairground Arts and Novelties" highlighting the important aspects of Luna Park. Artists Martin Sharp, Peter Kingston, Richard Liney and Garry Shead did major colour schemes and art works throughout the park. "It took us a while to realise that Luna Park was an artwork in itself, a city state of illusion, a brilliant feat of engineering with imagination, created and maintained by men. Sydney must acknowledge the importance of Luna Park. To lose it now would be a tragedy."

Closure: Big Dipper and Ghost Train incidents

On 16 April 1979, thirteen people were injured on the Big Dipper. A steel runner had come loose, halting one of the three rollercoaster trains. The following train rammed the stationary one, causing the injuries.

On 9 June 1979 the park's Ghost Train caught fire. The fire quickly destroyed the ride, which was understaffed and not adequately covered by the park's fire hose system, although it was contained before spreading to the nearby Big Dipper and River Caves. Searches of the charred rubble revealed the bodies of six children and one adult. The park was immediately shut down. A coronial inquest was unable to establish the cause of the fire, but concluded that Luna Park's managers and operators had failed in their duty of care towards the park's patrons.

The NSW government called for tenders at the end of July 1979. Two rounds of tenders failed to produce a satisfactory result for both the government and the applicants. A third round of tenders was called for in March 1980. As these tenders were being considered, Friends of Luna Park, a group founded by former and current Luna Park artists and concerned citizens, organised a "Save Luna Park" protest march from the Opera House to the Face. This was followed by a free concert headlined by Mental As Anything to promote awareness of the Park's plight. One of the results of this was the listing of the Luna Park Face as an item of national heritage by the National Trust of Australia, with the rest of Luna Park given a 'recorded' classification. The Big Dipper roller coaster suffered a demise in June 1981. Along with much of the original park, it was demolished by then owner, Col Goldstein. In the month before demolition, anything detachable was auctioned off; the River Caves, for example, sold for $20, purchased by the Friends of Luna Park. Rides long gone included the Tumble Bug, the Turkey Trot, the Barrels of Fun and the River Caves. Davey Jones' Locker is now but a painted facade. In 1981 the Luna Park Site Bill was passed which meant Luna Park Holdings had to vacate the site. Luna Park memorabilia and rides, dating from 1935 to 1981, were auctioned off. The Friends of Luna Park prepared a Conservation Plan in 1981.

Harbourside
Australian Amusements Associates won the tender in September 1980, and took over administration of the site in early June 1981. On 31 May and 1 June, an auction was held to sell everything in the park that could be removed. Two days later, everything that had not been sold (with the exception of the Face, Crystal Palace, and Coney Island) was bulldozed to the ground and burnt. The park was rebuilt by Australian Amusements, following design advice from Texas-based LARC International.

The newly-named Harbourside Amusement Park opened in April 1982. The change in name was caused by a dispute between the current and previous owners which prevented the use of the Luna Park name until August of that year. The park ran until 1988. During this six-year period, the Face was removed from over the entry gates on two occasions, the owners of Harbourside were involved in two disputes with the Department of Public Works, and one director was the subject of an inquiry by the Corporate Affairs Commission. The park was closed on 10 April 1988, when reports from independent engineers were presented stating that several rides in the park had to be shut down for "renovations and repairs". The entrance face which was a fibreglass caste of the 1973 Martin Sharp face was re-located to storage owned by the Powerhouse Museum.

In November 1988, Harbourside's lease was transferred to Luna Park Investments Pty Ltd. A year later, after no efforts had been made to repair and reopen Luna Park, and several submissions to replace most or all of the amusement park with high-rise apartment blocks and hotels, the New South Wales State Government issued an ultimatum to the company - open Luna Park by 1 June 1990, or lose the lease. Despite this ultimatum, Luna Park Investments did little to prepare the site. Rides were moved around, repainted, and renamed, to give the appearance that the new owners were trying to make an effort. The directors kept putting forward excuses to try to gain an extension, even declaring a trade union ban on their own site. Four days after the government ultimatum passed, the lease was terminated and the Luna Park Reserve Trust was established. Soon after this, the National Heritage Trust added several buildings on the site to its list of protected structures.

On 12 October 1990, the "Luna Park Site Act 1990" was gazetted, although the Act had been used prior to this to terminate Harbourside's lease and establish the Luna Park Reserve Trust. The Act was intended to protect the site of the park, dedicating it for amusement and public recreation. This act made Luna Park one of only two amusement parks in the world to be protected by government legislation, the other being Denmark's Tivoli Gardens.

Luna Park Renaissance
In 1991, the first two stages of the three-stage redevelopment and restoration plan for Luna Park was given the green light, with $25 million granted by the Open Space and Heritage Fund towards the project. The third stage, involving the demolition of sections of the old North Shore railway line (in use as a holding area for trains outside peak hour since 1932) and construction of parkland, an amphitheatre, art gallery, and museum, was not approved. In 1992 the Trust commissioned Godden Mackay heritage consultants to prepare a Conservation Plan for the site. The Luna Park Reserve Trust between 1993 and 1995 in accordance with this Conservation Plan undertook conservation and construction works. The actual construction plans were approved by North Sydney Council in August 1992, with Ted Hopkins also supporting the plans shown to him. Construction work began in January 1993, with the Face being moved back to its place over the entry gate. An 'army' of tradesmen and artists worked for six months on the restoration of the park's buildings, and on the repair of numerous artworks, including several of Arthur Barton's murals.

During the reconstruction, there was vocal opposition from a number of nearby residents and companies, on a variety of issues. The Environmental Protection Authority approved the construction of the new Big Dipper, on the condition that the Trust abided by strict noise control guidelines and covered the cost of soundproofing for any residents affected by excessive noise. In addition, North Sydney Council imposed a series of times when the roller coaster could not operate.

Luna Park reopened in January 1995. In the months that followed, the park was affected by poor weather conditions, causing lower than predicted attendance. Legal claims against the operation of the park and roller coaster were filed by some local residents, and supported by business figures whose tenders for the redevelopment had not been accepted. The newly elected Carr State Government put the park's long-term viability in doubt; first removing the government guarantee of a $14 million loan to the Trust, then dissolving the Trust's board of directors and appointing an administrator. The park was forced to close again on 14 February 1996.

In 1997 the Department of Land & Water Conservation (DLWC) engaged the Urban Design Advisory Service (UDAS) to investigate urban design and land use options for the future use of Luna Park. The Luna Park Plan of Management was prepared by the New South Wales government in 1998 to guide the future management of the Luna Park Reserve. The Luna Park Plan of Management identified a preferred option for Luna Park's future use, determined in consultation with residents, the general public and other stakeholders. The preferred option identified by the Luna Park Plan of Management sought to preserve Luna Park's amusement park character while introducing new uses to improve its viability and accordance with the parameters in the Luna Park Site Amendment Act 1997.

Metro Edgley involvement
Although the government said at the time of closure that submissions to utilise the Luna Park site would not be considered, several groups made public their ideas about how the park could be altered and run to satisfy the majority. There was also 'grass roots support' for the reopening of Luna Park; one example of this was the collection of a 5,000 signature petition by a pair of high school students. In June 1997, the New South Wales government presented four development proposals to the public. After a month of public viewing and comment, a 'diverse-use' plan, encompassing rides and amusements, restaurants, cafés, and function capacity was announced as the winning plan. In February 1998 the NSW Department of Public Works and Services called for proposals to redevelop Luna Park, and 20 proposals were submitted, with eight selected for further consideration.

In July 1999 the results of the tendering process were made public. Metro Edgley Group (consisting of Metro Edgley, Multiplex Facilities Management, and a group of private investors) was awarded the tender. Their proposal intended for most of the rides to stay, but called for the Big Dipper to be replaced with a multipurpose concert venue, and asked to redevelop Crystal Palace as a function centre. A Master Plan for the site was prepared in 1999 which included a Heritage Report prepared by Godden Mackay Logan. Further consultation with North Sydney Council brought the development to a standstill, with the Council and the directors of Metro Edgley clashing over several aspects of the proposed redevelopment. In January 2002 the Minister for Planning approved a development application for the site. On top of this, specific applications had to be lodged for each element of the plan, each of which in turn would require community consultation. The development eventually began in 2003.

During the long decision-making and approval process, Luna Park was permitted to operate for several charity-organised events, including for Variety Club and the Spastic Centre. The park was also allowed to operate on selected weekends and school holidays in late 2000 and early 2001, under strict, court-appointed conditions. In July 2001 the Big Dipper rollercoaster (installed in 1995) was sold to Dreamworld in Queensland. Recent work has included a new 2,000 seat big top, onsite car park, restaurant, refurbished Crystal Palace function centre and refurbishment of the rides.

2004 reopening to present

The redevelopment and restoration of Luna Park was conducted over 14 months. The rides were removed, restored, and in some cases upgraded to comply with modern safety standards. Crystal Palace was redesigned with several modular function rooms, the largest of which took up the entire lower floor.A 2,000 seat multipurpose auditorium, the Big Top, was constructed. Luna Park re-opened on 4 April 2004. Despite rain and low temperatures, several thousand people attended the opening day, and an accumulated attendance figure of 200,000 was reached within two months.

Legal action against the park by a group of seven Milsons Point residents and one developer began again in April 2005. The claim was of noise nuisance from the amusement rides, particularly those in Maloney's Corner. The case was defeated when legislation was passed by the New South Wales government protecting Luna Park from such claims, although it was later revealed that these laws may have been influenced by court documents leaked to then-Tourism, Sport, and Recreation minister Sandra Nori by two Luna Park executives. The executives were charged with contempt of court in August 2007. A new case began in June 2007, with the residents instead claiming breaches of the Trade Practices Act. Stating that they had been misled as to the types of amusement ride that were located in the Maloney's Corner area, the residents and developer attempted to claim over $20 million in damages, and demanded the relocation or permanent closure of the Ranger and Spider rides. The case was dismissed by the Supreme Court of New South Wales on 6 February 2009, with the supervising Justice ruling that the development applications submitted by the park had not been "misleading or deceptive", as claimed.

On 1 January 2007, a staff member working on the Golden Way Amusements-owned Speed (hired for the Christmas holidays) was struck in the head by the armature while the ride was in motion. The employee was taken to hospital and placed in intensive care. In October 2007, Multiplex announced that it was intending to sell the lease to one of the undeveloped sections of Luna Park. The section of land, advertised for approximately A$7 million, had initially been leased from the NSW Government for A$1, on the condition that any profit made from property built on the site was invested in the amusement park. There are concerns that the money will be used to allow Multiplex to recoup the financial outlay made when redeveloping the park, instead of going towards the ongoing operation and maintenance of Luna Park's facilities.

In late 2011, the NSW government allocated $78,000 in the state budget for upgrades of the park's lighting to LEDs, along with repairs to the park's buildings.

On the 19 March 2020, Luna Park confirmed that the park would be closed following the COVID-19 pandemic. The park reopened on 3 July 2020 with the implementation of additional safety measures, including regular cleaning between rides, limiting the number of visitors per ride, and health checks upon arrival. To spur visitation, a $30 million park upgrade is scheduled to be completed by December 2021. The park closed in January 2021 and nine new rides were built, including three roller coasters; one a Gerstlauer family shuttle coaster called Boomerang, and another a coaster designed for children called Little Nipper. These were supposed to open on June 26, but was delayed until October 22nd due to the COVID-19 pandemic. The third coaster is an Intamin Hot Racer that is Australia's first single-rail coaster, and is named Big Dipper after the coasters that operated before it. Big Dipper opened on December 26, 2021.

Park layout

Park Entrance

The iconic 9-meter wide (30 ft) smiling face, as well as its Art Deco towers, have presided over the main entrance for almost all of the park's existence. The idea was based on the large smiling faces at Luna Park, Melbourne, Australia, and Steeplechase Park in the United States. There have been eight distinct faces, installed in 1935, 1938, 1947, 1958, 1960, 1973, 1982, and 1995. The seventh face was donated to the Powerhouse Museum in May 1994. The eighth and current face was created by Australian sculpture company Natureworks. It was built in 1993 from heavy duty fiberglass and installed in 1995. The design is based on Arthur Barton's 1960 "Old King Cole" face.

Midway
Stretching from the Face to Coney Island, the Midway has always been the main thoroughfare of Luna Park. The Midway is the focus of many activities and amusements, and provides access to the Crystal Palace, Big Top, and Coney Island, along with the majority of Luna Park's permanent rides.

Crystal Palace
Beginning life in 1935 as a dodgem hall and office space, the Crystal Palace has seen many uses over the park's history, including as a dance hall, a BMX track, a games arcade, and a restaurant and bar.

Since the 2004 reopening, Crystal Palace has been host to four of the seven rooms used by Luna Park's functions business. The main room stretches across the entire lower floor of Crystal Palace, and is often used for wedding receptions and other large social functions. The Midway-facing exterior of the building is host to numerous sideshow games, such as the Laughing Clowns, Crazy Crooners, and Goin Fishin'.

Big Top

Constructed during the 2003 redevelopment on the site of the Ghost Train, the Big Top (originally to be named the Luna Circus) is a fully licensed, multi-purpose venue capable of seating 2,000 people (this capacity can increase to 3,000 for standing-only concerts). The modular design of the stage and seating allows the entire venue to be easily reconfigured for different event types, and the concrete building is heavily soundproofed to cut down on noise pollution. Examples of events run in the Big Top include concerts (including shows from Kylie Minogue's Anti Tour and the annual Come Together Music Festival), award shows and presentations (like the inaugural MTV Australia Video Music Awards or the live finals for the 2005–2008 seasons of Australia's Next Top Model), sporting tournaments (like the Australia Mixed Martial Arts Cage Fighting Championship and the 2013 Sydney Darts Masters), trade shows, and other large events.

Coney Island
First constructed in 1935, Coney Island - Funnyland is the only operating example of a 1930s funhouse left in the world. Although some changes have been made over the years, the layout is almost identical to when Luna Park opened in 1935. The design was based on funhouses in Europe and the United States, and contains rotating barrels, moving platforms, large slides, and arcade games. Today's Coney Island is also host to the restored artworks of Arthur Barton, who started as one of 35 artists, staying with the park until his retirement in 1970 (along with photographs and memorabilia spanning Luna Park's 85-year history). The slides and amusements are the same ones first used in 1935, but modified to meet modern safety standards. The amusements were saved from the 1981 demolition by the 'Friends of Luna Park' action group, who purchased them for $9,200, on the condition that they remain in the heritage-listed building.

Luna Land
Originally named Maloney's Corner, after Tony Maloney, a long-time Luna Park employee who started at 13 years old. Maloney's Corner was built on land purchased from the New South Wales government and the State Rail Authority during the 1994 development, so that supports for the Big Dipper could be built, and a park, including a Ghost Train Fire Memorial. During the 2003 redevelopment, this area was paved over so the Ranger, Spider and various children's rides could be relocated here from the Midway, to provide room for other developments.  In addition, temporary rides were hired by Luna Park for use during peak periods (such as school holidays) by Joylands for this area.  Around 2013, the Ranger was renamed to Moon Ranger. In late October 2020, the Spider and the Moon Ranger were removed. In November 2020, it was announced that the whole area would be cleared to make a new land called "Luna Land", with 9 brand new rides. 3 being Roller Coasters, 1 being a Thrill Flat Ride, and the rest being Children's Rides. The Park closed on January 26, 2021, and reopened with 8 new rides on October 22. These rides are: Boomerang, Bug, Cloud 9, Freaky Frogs, Little Nipper, Loopy Lighthouse, Sledgehammer, and Silly Sub. Big Dipper would open to the public on December 26, 2021.

Rides

Current rides

This is a list of all rides in operation at Luna Park as of 2022. This list does not include independently operated touring or temporary rides contracted to work at Luna Park during peak periods.

 Big Dipper III - The first single rail coaster in Australia, the first Intamin Hot Racer model, and the first launched single rail coaster in the world. The ride opened on 26 December 2021.
Hair Raiser - A  Larson International Super Shot drop tower added to the park in 2013.
 Wild Mouse - A Wild Mouse roller coaster, Luna Park's Wild Mouse was first installed in 1962, and although it has been disassembled and removed on several occasions, it has remained at Luna Park since 1995. It is one of only three wooden Wild Mouse roller coasters left in the world.
 Ferris Wheel - Standing 35 metres tall, the 24 gondola Ferris wheel was introduced to the park during the 1982 Harbourside development.
 Rotor - Luna Park's Rotor was first installed in 1951. It was continually a popular ride until its demolition at the end of 1986. A slightly smaller Rotor was constructed during the 1995 redevelopment.
 Carousel - A carousel by John H. Rundle Ltd.
 Volaré - Australia's tallest Swing ride and Luna Park's first permanent ride since 2013.
 Dodgem City - A nineteen car dodgem hall, Dodgem City is the latest in a series of dodgem car tracks constructed in the park, beginning with the one inside Crystal Palace in 1935.
2nd Tango Train - Opened in 2016, it's a rebuilt of the original Tango Train that closed in April 2016 mentioned down below.
Boomerang - A Gerstlauer family shuttle coaster. The layout is a modified version of Rewind Racers.
Sledgehammer - A Zamperla Discovery 360 opening in October 2021.
Little Nipper - A Preston & Barbieri Mini Coaster.
Silly Sub - Zamperla Crazy Bus
Freaky Frogs - A Zamperla Jump Around
Loopy Lighthouse - Zamperla Jumping Tower
Cloud Nine - Zamperla Samba Balloon
Bug - A Zamperla Mini Ferris Wheel

Previous rides of note
 Big Dipper I - A wooden roller coaster constructed in 1930 for Luna Park Glenelg. Operated at the Milsons Point site from 1935 to 1981, when it was demolished and burned following the park's 1979 closure.
 Ghost Train - A ghost train operating at Luna Park from 1935 until it burned down in mysterious circumstances on 9 June 1979. Seven people were killed in the fire.
 Big Dipper II - A steel roller coaster constructed in 1994. Noise pollution complaints by a resident action group focused primarily on the Big Dipper, stopping its operation in late 1995. The loss of revenue was partially responsible for the park's 1996 closure, and in 2001 the ride was renamed Cyclone and relocated to Dreamworld. The ride is currently known as the Gold Coaster.
 Geronimo - A Schwarzkopf Jet Star 2 that ran from 1982 to 1988.
 Tango Train I - A Music Express . Was closed on 25 April 2016 to be replaced with another ride that is Tango Train II. The Tango Train was dismantled and sold as parts.
Flying Saucer - A 1988 HUSS UFO. Was closed in 2013 and replaced by Volaré in 2019.
Moon Ranger - A HUSS Ranger coming to the park in 1995. Was closed and removed in 2020.
Tumblebug - A 1988 HUSS Troika, the Tumblebug was installed in 1995. The ride, named after the Tumble Bug operated by Luna Park from 1935 to 1973, was closed and removed in 2020. 
Spider - A HUSS Breakdance installed during the 1995 redevelopment, the Spider received its name from the park's 1938 ride. This was the last of the four HUSS rides that came to the park in 1995 remaining when it was closed and removed in late November 2020.
Octopus - An Octopus ride that came to the park in 1995 however was removed after the park closed in 1996.
Kids' Rides - Luna Park used to be host to four rides designed specifically for children. Originally being situated behind the face from 1995 to 2001 and in the Maloney's Corner section of the park from 2004. In 2021 they were removed to make way for new attractions. These were:
 Whirly Wheel - A miniature Ferris wheel.
 Mini Pirate Ship - A miniature swinging ship ride.
 Crazy Cars - A car themed teacup ride.
 U-Drive - A 'train' of cars propelled around a small track.

Description 
Luna Park includes several structures and items of significance, most notable are:

The Entrance Face and Towers
The first entrance to Luna Park was constructed in 1935 based on the design of the entrance to Melbourne's Luna Park at St Kilda. It consisted of two towers with an immense face between them and people entered through the gaping mouth. The face has been remodelled several times and its character has evolved over the years. Exposed to salt air the entrance face has required major maintenance work. Each time this has been carried out the facial expression has altered. The whole entrance was demolished in 1988. The present entrance face and towers were completed in January 1995. The expression of the present face is based on the 1960 face designed by Arthur Barton. The towers are constructed of steel frames, clad in fibre cement sheets, on brick bases. The face is made of fibreglass and foam.

The Midway
An important aspect of the park was the way it was laid out with a central spine that followed the shore line. "The Midway was where it all happened. It was the street, the forum, the piazza, the stage and the audience. The Park had been laid out so that no attraction protruded into the Midway except the Windmill which marked its only bend." The windmill was later replaced by the light house, which is now the Helter-Skelter. Pedestrian traffic travelled up and down this spine. After the first season canvas awnings were added along the Midway. It was the place where street theatre and entertainment took place. (Sam Marshall, "Luna Park Just for Fun")

Rotor
The Rotor was designed by German engineer Ernst Hoffmeister in the late 1940s.The Rotor is a large, upright barrel, rotated at 30 revolutions per minute. The rotation of the barrel creates a centrifugal force equivalent to between 1 and 1.5 g. Once the barrel has attained full speed, the floor is retracted, leaving the riders stuck to the wall of the drum. At the end of the ride cycle, the drum slows down and gravity takes over. The riders slide down the wall slowly. Although Hoffmeister was the designer, most Rotors were constructed under licence. The first Luna Park Rotor was built by Ted Hopkins in 1951. Three Rotors were built in Australia based on Hoffmeister's design. All had been demolished or destroyed by the 1980s, although a slightly redesigned Rotor was rebuilt for Luna Park Sydney in 1995, which is still in operation.

Coney Island (also Funnyland)
One of the original 1935 buildings of Luna Park, Coney Island is believed to have been erected firstly at Luna Park, Glenelg, although this has not been substantiated. It is a rectangular building with the longest side running east–west. It has a corrugated iron hip roof with its external walls forming parapet walls around each side. The basic structure of Coney Island is virtually identical to that of the Crystal Palace. It is similar in width but slightly shorter, having twelve bays. Internally the steelwork of the main structure is concealed by mural panels or decorated motifs which were physically conserved during 1994. The roof purlins and sheeting are exposed. The industrial light fittings are suspended from the roof. The open space contains large and small fun devices, giant slides 1–4, joy wheel, turkey trot and barrels of fun.

Crystal Palace (also Dodgem Building)
The Crystal Palace is located adjacent to the site of the approach tracks and locomotive depot of the original Milsons Point Railway Station (1893 10 1924). The essential form of the Crystal Palace is a large rectangular thirteen-bay steel-framed structure, two storeys in height with a hip roof behind extended walls. The end bays are framed with heavy Oregon members and the roof ends above them are gabled hips with louvered ventilation in the gables. The exteriors were originally symmetrical, the two long elevations having emphatic central elements and end pavilions. Parapets conceal the main roof; these are crenulated except for the tower motifs where chamfered blocks of timber, imitating machicolation, have been planted on. The cladding, once predominantly asbestos cement, has been replaced in the early 1990s works with fibre-cement. The centre of the east or Midway entrance elevation has a steep hipped roof between tall pinnacles, while the four "towers" of the end pavilions have steep pyramid roofs.

Wild Mouse
Located adjacent to Coney Island, the Wild mouse is a small roller coaster. The track is made of laminated timber with a steel rail constructed on a concrete platform elevated above the ground. The Wild Mouse cars hold two people seated one behind the other. The ride moves back and forth and up and down along its rectangular plan It was designed to have steep gradients, sharp turns and give the rider the feeling that they might fly off into the harbour. It was constructed at Luna Park in 1962 to a design purchased by Ted Hopkins at the Seattle World Trade Fair and was dismantled annually to go to the Sydney and Brisbane shows. Between 1970 and 1979 it was replaced by the Wild Cat but was returned when the park reopened in 1995.

Cliff Face
The sandstone formation along the eastern side of Luna Park has been shaped since the European settlement as it has been cut back for various purposes in previous years including: 1890s excavation for the North Shore Railway and the erection of Dorman Long workshops in the 1920s. Oral history stated that the tunnel and chamber in the cliff face (at the base) were constructed by Luna Park staff during World War Two as an air raid shelter, and that staff and local residents sheltered there during the wartime Japanese midget submarine attack on shipping in Sydney Harbour. However the capacity of this space was very limited.

Condition 

As at 17 August 2009, Entrance Face and Towers have been rebuilt as a replica. Coney Island and contents have been restored. The Crystal Palace has been restored with alterations.

Archaeological monitoring of Luna Park site was undertaken in c.1993 during redevelopment. Conservation works undertaken in 1997 to remove in 1993-1994

The Luna Park amusement centre has evolved and been altered over time and much of the original fabric of the structures and rides have been replaced with similar or identical components. Despite the replacement of fabric the significance of the place has been maintained through careful reconstruction and commitment to the original design aesthetic.
"The primary significance of the place therefore vests in the concept, design and associative values of place, rather than in any particular fabric. Retaining the integrity of the place therefore requires attention to matters such as design, concept and memories rather than keeping existing fabric and physical evidence." Richard Mackay quoted in Letter from Luna Park Sydney Pty Ltd 2009

Modifications and dates 
A number of rides and attractions have been introduced and removed at Luna Park over the past sixty-five years.

In media

Luna Park Sydney has been used as a filming location for sections of several works of film and television. In 1959, the entire park was used for Leslie Norman's film adaptation of Summer of the Seventeenth Doll, based on the play by Ray Lawler. Also, during this decade, sequences were filmed for the Six O'Clock Rock and Skippy the Bush Kangaroo television series.

In 1976, television soap opera Number 96 had characters Dorrie and Herbert Evans, Flo Patterson and Junior Winthrop (Pat McDonald, Ron Shand, Bunney Brooke and Curt Jansen) visit the park, including scenes of them in Coney Island, eating fairy floss, and riding on the Big Dipper and the Topsy-Turvy House. This footage, from Episode 920, has been preserved digitally and was featured in Number 96: And They Said It Wouldn't Last, a bonus feature on the 2006 DVD release of the feature film version of the show, Number 96: 2 Disc Collectors Edition.

Luna Park also appeared in the 1977 telemovie Gone to Ground and two episodes of the 1989 programme Betty's Bunch.

Following the 1996 closure of the park, Luna Park (in particular the Big Dipper) was used for a section of Our Lips Are Sealed starring Mary-Kate and Ashley Olsen. The 'memory sequences' in Farscape episode "Infinite Possibilities Part I: Daedalus Demands", material for the two-part '100th episode' of JAG, "Boomerang", and scenes for the Bollywood film Dil Chahta Hai were filmed at points between the 1996 closure and the 2001 removal of the Big Dipper. During this time, the documentary Spirits of the Carnival - The Quest for Fun was filmed about the history of amusement parks named 'Luna Park' in general, and Luna Park Sydney specifically. Following Luna Park's reopening in 2004, material was filmed in the park's Rotor for the 2006 film Candy. Luna Park was also featured in a few episodes for the Australian TV series Dance Academy.

Luna Park was mentioned in the song "Upstairs In My House" by the Australian band Men At Work on their 1983 album "Cargo".

It is also featured in Seventeen's Healing music video which was released on 16 October 2016. It was filmed when they went to Australia for their fan meeting (Shining Diamonds: Asia Pacific Tour) in both Melbourne and Sydney.

Lady Leshurr filmed her music video for "On My Way" at Luna Park Sydney.

The auditions for season 9 of Australia's Got Talent were filmed in the Big Top building at Luna Park, with the judges being seen on the rides at the beginnings of some episodes.

In March 2021, a 3 part documentary aired on ABC TV and ABC iView called "EXPOSED: The Ghost Train Fire" which showed interviews of survivors, families of those perished in the fire, employees of Luna Park and other people exposed to the incident.

The video game Newfound Courage's expansion, Return to Otherwhere, contains a theme park inspired heavily by Sydney's Luna Park, including several of the rides which players are required to use.

Heritage listing 
As at 15 October 2009, The site now known as Luna Park Precinct is historically significant as the site of the first regular ferry transport between Sydney and the North Shore, and later the busiest ferry wharf on the Harbour, with the exception of Circular Quay. The Milsons Point site was a major transport interchange during the later part of the 19th Century connecting ferry, train and trams. The site later became crucial to the construction of the Sydney Harbour Bridge. Fabrication and assembly of steel components for the bridge was done on site at the 1925 Dorman Long and Company workshops. After removal of the workshops the Luna Park amusement park was constructed on the site in 1935 and became a centre for recreation for generations of Sydney residents and visitors.

Luna Park has strong association with former park artists Rupert Browne, Peter Kingston, Gary Shead, Sam Lipson, Arthur Barton, Richard Liney and Martin Sharp. Martin Sharp is an important Sydney artist with an international reputation who was influential in the Australian Pop Art movement in the 1960s and 70s. The Luna Park Precinct has important aesthetic values in its own right, a celebration of colour and fantasy originally in the art deco style, and as a landmark on Sydney Harbour.

Luna Park occupies an important and prominent location on the northern foreshore of Sydney Harbour and is highly visible from Circular Quay and the Opera House and other key harbour vantage points. Luna Park is one of Sydney's most recognisable and popular icons, the Luna Park face in particular is an instantly recognisable symbol of Sydney. The prominence of Luna Park is enhanced by the high quarried cliff face and the fig trees which provide a landscaped backdrop together with the way it is framed by the Harbour Bridge when viewed from the east. Luna Park includes a rare collection of murals and amusements that demonstrate mid 20th century popular and traditional technologies. These have been complemented by the art works of Martin Sharp, Richard Liney, Gary Shead and Peter Kingston some of which survive as moveable items associated with the park and stored at other locations such as the Powerhouse Museum.

Luna Park is important as a place of significance to generations of the Australian Public, in particular Sydney siders who have strong memories and associations with the place. Its landmark location at the centre of Sydney Harbour together with its recognisable character has endowed it with a far wider sense of ownership, granting it an iconic status. Luna Park received considerable attention following the tragic Ghost Train fire of 1979 and the ensuing short term closure of the park. It became the focus of considerable public action when it was threatened with redevelopment and remains a subject of high public interest.

Luna Park Precinct has very high potential as an archaeological resource that is likely to yield information about all phases of occupation of the site. In particular evidence of the Dorman Long wharf and the railway. Luna Park is unique as a rare example of an amusement park and fantasy architecture constructed in the 1930s art deco style. The original murals and design of Luna Park demonstrate an amusement park aesthetic that was originally inherited from America and reinterpreted in an Australian context. The Luna Park precinct includes many individual elements of significance. The most significant elements are the Entrance Face and Towers; Midway; the Rotor; Coney Island; Crystal Palace; Wild Mouse; the Cliff Face and the Fig Trees.

Luna Park Precinct was listed on the New South Wales State Heritage Register on 5 March 2010 having satisfied the following criteria.

The place is important in demonstrating the course, or pattern, of cultural or natural history in New South Wales.

The site now known as Luna Park Precinct is historically significant as the site of the first regular ferry transport between Sydney and the North Shore, and later the busiest ferry wharf on the Harbour, with the exception of Circular Quay. The Milsons Point site was a major transport interchange during the later part of the 19th Century connecting ferry, train and trams. The site later became crucial to the construction of the Sydney Harbour Bridge. Fabrication and assembly of steel components for the bridge was done on site at the 1925 Dorman Long and Company workshops. The Luna Park amusement park constructed on the site in 1935 after the removal of the workshops has been a centre for recreation for generations of Sydney residents and visitors. It became the focus of considerable public action when it was threatened with closure and redevelopment.

The place has a strong or special association with a person, or group of persons, of importance of cultural or natural history of New South Wales's history.

Luna Park has strong association with former park artists, Rupert Browne, Peter Kingston, Gary Shead, Sam Lipson, Arthur Barton, Richard Liney and Martin Sharp. Martin Sharp is an important Sydney artist with an international reputation who was influential in the Australian Pop Art movement in the 1960s and 70s. Examples of the work of these artists survive as moveable items associated with the park and are stored at other locations such as the Powerhouse Museum.

The place is important in demonstrating aesthetic characteristics and/or a high degree of creative or technical achievement in New South Wales.

The Luna Park Precinct has important aesthetic values in its own right, a celebration of colour and fantasy originally in the art deco style, and as a landmark on Sydney Harbour. Luna Park occupies an important and prominent location on the northern foreshore of Sydney Harbour and is highly visible from Circular Quay and the Opera House and other key harbour vantage points. Luna Park is one of Sydney's most recognisable and popular icons, the Luna Park face in particular is an instantly recognisable symbol of Sydney. The prominence of Luna Park is enhanced by the high quarried cliff face and the fig trees which provide a landscaped backdrop together with the way it is framed by the Harbour Bridge when viewed from the east. Luna Park includes a rare collection of murals and amusements that demonstrate mid 20th century popular art and traditional technologies. These have been complemented by the art works of Martin Sharp, Richard Liney, Gary Shead and Peter Kingston.

The place has a strong or special association with a particular community or cultural group in New South Wales for social, cultural or spiritual reasons.

Luna Park is important as a place of significance to generations of the Australian Public, in particular Sydney siders who have strong memories and associations with the place. Its landmark location at the centre of Sydney Harbour together with its recognisable character has endowed it with a far wider sense of ownership, granting it an iconic status. Luna Park received considerable attention following the tragic Ghost Train fire of 1979 and the ensuing short term closure of the park. It became the focus of considerable public action when it was threatened with redevelopment and remains a subject of high public interest. "It has become symbolic of political and community concern for issues such as the treatment of harbour foreshore, opposition to high-rise development and retention in public ownership of the public estate."

The place has potential to yield information that will contribute to an understanding of the cultural or natural history of New South Wales.

Luna Park Precinct is a resource that is likely to yield information through archaeological investigation. Physical and visual evidence survives from most of the major phases of use and activities undertaken within the area. Luna Park has potential to contain archaeological resources associated with all historical phases of the site's development, including pre-European occupation, development of transport systems in this area, the Dorman Long and Co phase of activity and development and the establishment and development of Luna Park itself. In the unlikely event that intact deposits of Aboriginal relics are present, these would have considerable research potential.

The place possesses uncommon, rare or endangered aspects of the cultural or natural history of New South Wales.

Luna Park is unique as a rare surviving example of an amusement park and fantasy architecture in the art deco idiom of the 1930s. The original murals and design of Luna Park demonstrate an amusement park aesthetic that was inherited from America and reinterpreted in an Australian context.

The place is important in demonstrating the principal characteristics of a class of cultural or natural places/environments in New South Wales.

Does not meet this criteria.

See also 

Big Dipper (Luna Park Sydney)

References

Bibliography

Attribution

External links

Phillips brothers biography: [2], by Bruce Corneil

New South Wales State Heritage Register
Amusement parks in New South Wales
Articles incorporating text from the New South Wales State Heritage Register
1935 establishments in Australia
Amusement parks opened in 1935
Buildings and structures in Sydney
Tourist attractions in Sydney
Milsons Point, New South Wales